In mathematics, a super-Poissonian distribution is a probability distribution that has a larger variance than a Poisson distribution with the same mean. Conversely, a sub-Poissonian distribution has a smaller variance.

An example of super-Poissonian distribution is negative binomial distribution.

The Poisson distribution is a result of a process where the time (or an equivalent measure) between events has an exponential distribution, representing a memoryless process.

Mathematical definition

In probability theory it is common to say a distribution, D, is a sub-distribution of another distribution E if D 's moment-generating function, is bounded by E 's up to a constant.
In other words

for some C > 0.

A distribution is strictly sub- if C ≤ 1.
From this definition a distribution, D, is sub-Poissonian if

for all t > 0.

An example of a sub-Poissonian distribution is the Bernoulli distribution, since

Because sub-Poissonianism is preserved by sums, we get that the binomial distribution is also sub-Poissonian.

References

Poisson point processes
Types of probability distributions